Óscar Céspedes Cabeza (born 6 February 1978) is a Spanish former footballer and current manager of Chinese side Shaanxi Chang'an Athletic.

Club career
Céspedes started his career with Spanish giants Barcelona, though he never made an appearance for the club. He went on to forge a career in the Spanish third and fourth tiers.

Career statistics

Club

Notes

Managerial statistics

References

1978 births
Living people
Spanish footballers
Spanish football managers
Association football midfielders
FC Barcelona players
RCD Espanyol footballers
RCD Espanyol B footballers
Algeciras CF footballers
Motril CF players
Girona FC players
Rayo Vallecano players
Rayo Vallecano B players
UE Sant Andreu footballers
Palamós CF footballers
UE Figueres footballers
Terrassa FC footballers
CF Gavà players
Racing de Ferrol footballers
UDA Gramenet footballers
FC Martinenc players
Qingdao F.C. managers
Spanish expatriate sportspeople in China
Expatriate football managers in China
China League One managers